The  Philippine Telegraph and Telephone Corporation (PT&T) is a telecommunications services provider in the Philippines since its establishment in 1962. The company caters to corporate, small/medium business, and residential segments across the country. 
PT&T's business is categorized into two major services: Connectivity and IT Services.

History
PT&T was incorporated on October 16, 1962, and subsequently registered with the Philippine Securities and Exchange Commission on November 14, 1962, under the laws of the Philippines.

PT&T was granted a 25-year national legislative franchise on June 20, 1964, under Republic Act (“RA”) No. 4161, as amended by RA Nos. 5048 and 6970. On July 21, 2016, under RA No. 10894, the company was granted an extension of its franchise for another 25 years. The franchise allows PT&T to establish, install, maintain and operate wire and/or wireless telecommunications systems, lines, circuits, and stations throughout the Philippines for public domestic and international communications.

PT&T was listed on January 10, 1990, for the trading of its common shares but requested voluntary suspension of trading effective December 13, 2004.

It was a major competitor of PLDT in the 1990s prior to the 1997 Asian financial crisis.

In 2017, a consortium led by businessmen Lucio Tan, Jr., Salvador Zamora II, and Benjamin Bitanga acquired a majority stake of 70% in the ownership of PT&T from its previous owner Republic Telecommunication Holdings. The acquisition price was not disclosed.

In November 2017, the company announced that it entered negotiations with China Telecom and Datang Telecom Technology regarding plans to form a consortium for its bid. In 2018, PT&T bid for the country's next third telecommunications provider. PT&T was disqualified and the winner of the bid belongs to the Mislatel consortium (now Dito Telecommunity). The National Telecommunications Commission (NTC) said that PT&T failed to meet the technical requirements it has set for bidders.<ref>

Ownership

See also
 Telecommunications in the Philippines
 Internet in the Philippines
 List of companies of the Philippines
 Companies listed on the Philippine Stock Exchange
 Companies based in Makati

References

External links
Official website

Telecommunications companies of the Philippines
Telecommunications companies established in 1962
1962 establishments in the Philippines